Nathalie Schneyder (born May 25, 1968) is an American competitor in synchronised swimming and Olympic champion.

Born in San Francisco, California, she was member of the American team that received a gold medal in synchronized swimming at the 1996 Summer Olympics in Atlanta.

References

1968 births
Living people
American synchronized swimmers
Synchronized swimmers at the 1996 Summer Olympics
Olympic gold medalists for the United States in synchronized swimming
Olympic medalists in synchronized swimming
World Aquatics Championships medalists in synchronised swimming
Synchronized swimmers at the 1991 World Aquatics Championships
Medalists at the 1996 Summer Olympics